The Aleksander Węgierko Drama Theatre in Białystok is a repertory theatre in Białystok, established in 1938. It was founded by actor Aleksander Węgierko.

History

In 1938, the building of the Municipal Theatre – Marshal Józef Piłsudski People's Home (Polish: Teatr Miejski –  Dom Ludowy im. Marszałka Józefa Piłsudskiego) was completed. Shortly after Christmas, a performance of Cydzik & Co (Polish: Cydzik i spółka) was staged there, as the first performance in this building.

In 1940, a group of distinguished Warsaw actors, under the guidance of Aleksander Węgierko, came to Białystok fleeing from the Germans. Their stay in Białystok was short, but pivotal, since they created the first permanent company in the theatre. They produced such plays as Intrigue and Love by Friedrich Schiller,  Life Pension by Aleksander Fredro, and Pygmalion by George B. Shaw. The most popular event though was a Mickiewicz evening, consisting of excerpts of Pan Tadeusz, Konrad Wallenrod and Forefathers’ Eve (Polish: Dziady). The performances were all in Polish and the national anthem was sung, all this at the time when Białystok belonged to the Byelorussian Soviet Socialist Republic.

This episode finished in 1941. While the company was giving guest performances in Minsk and Brest, the Operation Barbarossa broke out. On the way back, some of the artists, including Węgierko, were arrested by the Germans and never returned to Białystok. The theatre itself also suffered: part of the building was burnt while the city was being bombarded. Węgierko was even said to have perished in the walls of the Białystok theatre. However, this is only a legend, showing how closely the theatre had become connected with this artist in the imagination of the residents of Białystok. Węgierko died in Warsaw, though it is not clear whether in the ghetto or in Pawiak prison.

Shortly after the liberation of the city, a handful of artists who had survived the war and could not immediately return to Warsaw or Cracow, where war was still waging, took cover in Białystok. Joanna Błońska, Halina Kossobudzka, Halina Czengery, Lidia Zamkow, Marian Meller (the first postwar managing director), Jan Świderski, and Czesław Wołłejko made up the first company after the war, and were soon joined by Białystok actors. As early as on 22 September 1944 they premiered My Quail  Has Fled (Polish: Uciekła mi przepióreczka) by Stefan Żeromski, which was the first performance in post-war Poland.

References

External links

Węgierki
Theatres completed in 1938
1938 establishments in Poland